The nominees for the 2011 Ovation Awards were announced on September 19, 2011, at the Falcon Theatre in Burbank, California.  The awards were presented for excellence in stage productions in the Los Angeles area from September, 2010 to August, 2011 based upon evaluations from 250 members of the Los Angeles theater community.

The winners were announced on November 14, 2011 in a ceremony at the Orpheum Theatre in Downtown Los Angeles.  The ceremony was hosted by actress Carolyn Hennesy.

Awards 
Winners are listed first and highlighted in boldface.

Ovation Honors 

Ovation Honors, which recognize outstanding achievement in areas that are not among the standard list of nomination categories, were presented when the nominations were announced.

 Composition for a Play – Brian Joseph, Lyle Lovett, Fred Sanders, Sara Watkins & Sean Watkins – Much Ado About Nothing – The Shakespeare Center Of Los Angeles
 Fight Choreography – Brian Danner – The Walworth Farce – Theatre Of NOTE
 Puppet Design – Kristopher Bicknell, Gwyneth Conaway Bennison & Miles Taber – D Is For Dog – Rogue Artists Ensemble
 Video Design – Jason Thompson – Venice – Center Theatre Group: Kirk Douglas Theatre

References 

Ovation Awards
Ovation
2011 in Los Angeles
Ovation